The eighth season of Hell's Kitchen, an American reality competition television series starring Gordon Ramsay, premiered on the Fox Network on September 22, 2010, and continued until December 15, 2010. Sous Chef Nona Sivley won the competition, earning a head chef position at the L.A. Market restaurant at the JW Marriott Hotel at L.A. Live in Los Angeles, as well as an opportunity to be a spokesperson for Rosemount Estate Wines. This would be the last season to feature 16 contestants, until season 17.

Sabrina Brimhall is the second person after Virginia Dalbeck (from season 2) to hold the distinction of being nominated at every opportunity she was not on the winning team or granted immunity by Chef Ramsay. She is also the second person after Autumn Lewis (from season 7) to be nominated a total of seven times.

Format

The first half of each episode consists of a team challenge, in which the winning side gets a reward of some sort of leisure activity, while the losing side has to clean up and prepare both kitchens, as well as some activity that is not so pleasant. Afterwards, the teams compete in executing a dinner service, during which Ramsay can impose additional punishments or kick chefs out of the kitchen. The losing team(s) nominates chefs to be considered for elimination. Ramsay can also nominate chefs, and ultimately sends a chef home. At six chefs left, the teams merge to one, and the chefs compete as individuals.

Staff
Gordon Ramsay returned to the series as the head chef, as well as sous chefs Scott Leibfried and Andi van Willigan. James Lukanik served as the maître d', replacing Jean-Philippe Susilovic, who had been serving as a restaurant director at Ramsay's restaurant in London, Petrus. Seasons 7 and 8 were taped a year apart, resulting in other staff changes.

Broadcast
Hell's Kitchen was planned to air weekly from September to December 2010. However, due to Fox's televising of the Major League Baseball playoffs and the World Series in October and November, the show was broadcast with double episodes from September 22 until October 13 in addition to double episodes on November 10 and single episodes from November 17 until the finale on December 15. This is the first time that the series took more than a week off while the competition was in progress. Cablevision did not carry Fox during the first sixteen days of the hiatus due to a carriage dispute.

Contestants
16 chefs competed in season eight. Ages shown are at the start of competition.

Notes

Contestant progress

Episodes

Notes

References
 Recaps

 Other references

External links
 Hell's Kitchen official Fox.com website by Fox Broadcasting Company

Hell's Kitchen (American TV series)
2010 American television seasons